A list of Kannada language films produced in the Kannada film industry in India in 2017.
 Films are generally released every Friday or Festival Day
 In addition films can be released on specific festival days

Film awards events
 64th National Film Awards
 2016 Karnataka State Film Awards 
 64th Filmfare Awards South
 6th South Indian International Movie Awards
 Suvarna Film Awards, by Suvarna channel.
 Udaya Film Awards, by Udaya Channel
 Bengaluru International Film Festival
 Bangalore Times Film Awards

Scheduled releases

January–June

July–December

Dubbed films

Notable deaths

References

External links
 Kannada Movies of 2016 at Internet Movie Database

Lists of 2017 films by country or language
2017
2017 in Indian cinema